Catasetum expansum, the expansive catasetum, is a species of orchid found in Ecuador.

References

External links 
 
 

expansum
Orchids of Ecuador
Plants described in 1878